Dalaki Rural District is in the Central District of Dashtestan County, Bushehr province, Iran. At the census of 2006, its population was 10,490 in 2,237 households; there were 11,761 inhabitants in 3,007 households at the following census of 2011; and in the most recent census of 2016, the population of the rural district was 12,208 in 3,394 households. The largest of its 15 villages was Deh Qaed, with 7,509 people.

References 

Rural Districts of Bushehr Province
Populated places in Dashtestan County